Torrey Eglesby Wales (June 20, 1820 – July 5, 1902) was an American politician who served as the 2nd Mayor of Burlington, Vermont.

Early life
Torrey E. Wales was born in Westford, Vermont on June 20, 1820, a son of Danforth and Lovisa (Sibley) Wales. Danforth Wales was a successful clothier whose business interests later included a gristmill and a sawmill, and he represented Westford for several terms in the Vermont House of Representatives.

Wales was educated in the schools of Westford and nearby towns, then began attendance at the University of Vermont, from which he graduated in 1841. He then studied law, first with Archibald Hyde, and later Asahel Peck. He attained admission to the bar in 1845, and began to practice in Burlington.

Legal and business career
In 1846, illness caused Wales to seek a warmer climate. He resided with relatives near Holly Springs, Mississippi for three years, during which he worked as a tutor for a plantation-owning family. He returned to Burlington in 1849, and resumed practicing law.

Among the prospective lawyers who learned under Wales's tutelage was Russell S. Taft, who later became a partner in Wales's law firm. In the years immediately prior to the American Civil War, Wales was active in a Burlington militia company, the Howard Guards. He was also a member of the board of directors of the Farmers and Merchants Bank, which was later reorganized as the Merchants Bank. He also served as treasurer of the Mary Fletcher Hospital, and was a member of the board of trustees for the University of Vermont. He also served as a volunteer fire fighter as a member of Burlington's Boxer Company.

Political career

Chittenden County
Originally a Whig, and later a Republican, Wales was long active in Vermont politics and government. In 1854, Wales was elected State's Attorney of Chittenden County, and he served until 1857. In 1862, he was elected the county's probate court judge, and he served until 1898.

Burlington
In 1854, he was elected to Burlington's board of selectmen. After Burlington was incorporated as a city, he served as its second mayor from 1866 to 1868.  He served on the board of aldermen from 1869 to 1871, and performed the mayor's duties after the resignation of Daniel Chipman Linsley.  He again served as an alderman from 1874 to 1875. From 1883 to 1884, Wales was Burlington's city attorney.  Among the other offices in which Wales served the city were justice of the peace and street commissioner.

State legislature
In 1868  and 1869, Wales was elected to represent Burlington in the Vermont House of Representatives. He was elected to the Vermont House again in 1876 and served until 1878.

Death and burial
On July 5, 1902 Wales died at his home in Burlington. The funeral took place in Burlington at the Congregational Church on College Street. He was buried at Lakeview Cemetery in Burlington.

Family
In 1846, Wales married Elizabeth C. Mason (1822-1886). In 1888, he married Helen M. Mason (d. 1895) a niece of his first wife.

With his first wife, Wales was the father of two sons, George W. Wales (1855-1890), and Henry H. Wales (1858-1860).

In April 1868, George Wales was accidentally shot in the lung by the instructor who was teaching him business writing at a Burlington commercial college. He made a full recovery, and Torrey Wales and he later practiced law together as Wales & Wales. George Wales went on to serve as private secretary for U.S. Senators Justin Smith Morrill and Henry L. Dawes, and Secretary of Civil and Military Affairs (chief assistant) to Governor John L. Barstow.

References

External links

1820 births
1902 deaths
People from Westford, Vermont
University of Vermont alumni
Vermont lawyers
Vermont Whigs
Vermont Republicans
State's attorneys in Vermont
Mayors of Burlington, Vermont
Vermont state court judges
Members of the Vermont House of Representatives
19th-century American politicians
Burials at Lakeview Cemetery (Burlington, Vermont)
19th-century American judges